Charles E. Cassidy (September 11, 1901 – May 27, 1972) was a college football and lacrosse player for the Cornell Big Red, inducted into the Cornell Athletics Hall of Fame. After graduation, he served as Attorney General for the Territory of Hawaii and U.S. Commissioner after Hawaii became a state. He was a justice of the Hawaii Supreme Court from October 5, 1959 to May 8, 1967.

Cornell

Born in San Francisco, California to John Cassidy and Eliza (Emmes) Cassidy, Cassidy attended Cornell University. He was a prominent end and fullback for the Cornell Big Red football teams of 1921, 1922, and 1923, in the backfield with George Pfann, Eddie Kaw, and Floyd Ramsey.

Cassidy received an LL.B. from Cornell University in 1925.

Law career
Cassidy began his law career in New York City, moving to Hawaii in 1926 to work for the office of the United States Attorney there.

Personal life
On June 30, 1930, Cassidy married Helen O. Moses, a member of the 1920 United States Olympic swim team.

References

External links

1901 births
Justices of the Hawaii Supreme Court
American football ends
American football fullbacks
Cornell Big Red football players
1972 deaths
20th-century American judges